My Laugh Comes Last is a 1977 thriller novel by British writer James Hadley Chase.

Plot summary
Larry Lucas is a small-time worker, who is one day approached by a millionaire, Farell Brannigan, to assist him and start a new bank in town, which should be the safest in the world. Thrilled by the offer, Larry jumps for it, starts minting money and enters high class circles, only to come across a series of problems on the way, involving deception, hypocrisy, treachery, murder, blackmail. The rest of the story is about how and whether Larry is able to deal with and survive it all.

References

External links
 My Laugh Comes Last at Goodreads.com
 
 

British thriller novels
1977 British novels
Novels by James Hadley Chase
British novels adapted into films
Robert Hale books